The 2019 Leeds City Council election took place on Thursday 2 May 2019 to elect members of Leeds City Council in England. It was held on the same day as other  UK local elections across England and Northern Ireland.

As per the election cycle, one third of the council's 99 seats were up for election. This followed the re-election of all of the 99 council seats in the 2018 all-out council election. It had resulted from an electoral ward boundary review and saw the election of three councillors for each of the 33 electoral wards and their new ward boundaries. The third-placed candidate elected in every ward was granted a single year term and their seats are up for election this year.

Elected councillors were granted the usual four-year term until 2023 in order to return to the typical election cycle of elections in three of every four years.

The Labour Party maintained their majority control of the council despite losing four seats, also retaining their one Calverley and Farsley councillor by 27 votes.

Election summary

|- style="text-align: right; font-weight: bold;"
! scope="row" colspan="2" | Total
| 175
| 33
| 4
| 4
| 0
| 100.0
| 100.0
| 172,076
| 366,927

The election result had the following consequences for the political composition of the council:

Councillors who did not stand for re-election

Incumbent Morley Borough Independent councillor, Tom Leadley, did not stand again for Morley North ward, standing unsuccessfully in the neighbouring ward of Ardsley & Robin Hood.

Ward results

Adel & Wharfedale

Alwoodley

Ardsley & Robin Hood

Armley

Beeston & Holbeck

Bramley & Stanningley

Burmantofts & Richmond Hill

Calverley & Farsley

Chapel Allerton

Cross Gates & Whinmoor

Farnley & Wortley

Garforth & Swillington

Gipton & Harehills

Guiseley & Rawdon

Harewood

Headingley & Hyde Park

Horsforth

Hunslet & Riverside

Killingbeck & Seacroft

Kippax & Methley

Kirkstall

Little London & Woodhouse

Middleton Park

Moortown

Morley North
Since vacating his seat at the 2018 Election to stand for Morley South ward, Robert Finnigan was re-elected to the council whilst incumbent MBI councillor Tom Leadley stood in Ardsley & Robin Hood ward.

Morley South

Otley & Yeadon

Pudsey

Rothwell

Roundhay

Temple Newsam

Weetwood

Wetherby

By-elections between 2019 and 2020

Notes

References 

Leeds
2019
2010s in Leeds
May 2019 events in the United Kingdom